Elmhurst station could refer to:
 Elmhurst (LIRR station) in Elmhurst, Queens
 Elmhurst station (Illinois) in Elmhurst, Illinois
 Elmhurst railway station in Elmhurst, Victoria, Australia